Dulin may refer to :

 Ashton Dulin (born 1997), American football player
 Brice Dulin (born 1990), French rugby union player
 Pierre Dulin or Pierre d’Ulin (1669–1748), 17th century French painter
 Dul Beyn, a city in Iran